Medio Atrato is a municipality and town in the Chocó Department, Colombia.

Climate
Medio Atrato has an extremely wet tropical rainforest climate (Af).

References

Municipalities of Chocó Department